Tsunda is an ancient city, administrative and religious center of the historical province Javakheti in Georgia. The city is mentioned in the chronicles. Tsunda served as the summer residence of kings and was the seat of the bishop in the end of the 5th century. No ancient remnant present. The only buildings include the Tsunda Church of the 12-13th century and the 19th century caravanserai. After the decline of Tsunda, new feudal city-fortress Tmogvi grew on the opposite, left bank of Mtkvari River.

See also 
Tmogvi
Tsunda Church

References

Javakheti
Former cities in Georgia (country)